Thyatira cognata is a moth in the family Drepanidae. It was described by Warren in 1888. It is found in India (Himachal Pradesh).

References

Moths described in 1888
Thyatirinae